John Andreu Neeskens Ramírez (born November 17, 1993), known as John Neeskens, is an American professional soccer player who plays for Terrassa FC as a left back.

Club career
Born in Tulsa, Oklahoma, Neeskens began playing soccer with local PB Anguera and Damm, going on to have spells with Villarreal, Sant Andreu, and Badalona. He moved to American club Colorado Rapids in 2014 and made his professional debut versus Chicago Fire on June 5.

He was released just before the start of the 2015 Major League Soccer season. On September 17, 2015, Neeskens signed with the New York Cosmos's B-team.

Neeskens joined LA Galaxy II on March 14, 2016. After a short stay and limited minutes with LA Galaxy II, he joined Segunda División B club CF Gava on July 9, 2016.

Neeskens played for F.C. Santboià, starting with the 2017–18 season.

Before 2019–20 season, he joined former Slovak champions AS Trenčín. He only featured twice in league play and once in cup play. He scored a goal in his second league appearance against Senica, utilizing a pass from Gino van Kessel. Trenčín lost the match 2–3.

Personal life
Media outlets often erroneously report that John Neeskens is the son of former Dutch international Johan Neeskens, Johan Neeskens has stated via his personal website in November 2010 that John Neeskens is not his son.

Through his birth and ancestry, he holds American, Spanish, and Dutch citizenship.

Honors 
New York Cosmos B
National Premier Soccer League: 2015

References

External links 

1993 births
Living people
Spanish people of Dutch descent
Spanish footballers
American soccer players
Association football defenders
Segunda División B players
Tercera División players
Major League Soccer players
Slovak Super Liga players
USL Championship players
Villarreal CF players
UE Sant Andreu footballers
CF Badalona players
CF Gavà players
Colorado Rapids players
LA Galaxy II players
CF Damm players
FC Santboià players
AS Trenčín players
SD Formentera players
AE Prat players
Lleida Esportiu footballers
Spanish expatriate footballers
Spanish expatriate sportspeople in the United States
Spanish expatriate sportspeople in Slovakia
Expatriate soccer players in the United States
Expatriate footballers in Slovakia
American expatriate soccer players